Analalava is a district in northern Madagascar. It is a part of Sofia Region and borders the districts of Ambanja in northeast, Bealanana and Antsohihy in east and Boriziny (Port-Bergé) in south.

Communes
The district is further divided into 11 communes:

 Ambaliha
 Ambarijeby
 Analalava
 Andriambavontsona
 Ankaramy Be
 Antonibe
 Befotaka
 Mahadrodroka
 Maromandia
 Marovantaza
 Marovatolena

National Parks
The Sahamalaza National Park is situated in the municipality of Analalava.
Anjajavy Forest at Antonibe

References

Districts of Sofia Region